Selimiye Barracks, also known as Scutari Barracks, is a Turkish Army barracks located in the Üsküdar district on the Asian side of Istanbul, Turkey. It was originally built in 1800 by Sultan Selim III for the soldiers of the newly established  Nizam-ı Cedid (literally "New Order") within the framework of the Ottoman military reform efforts. Today, it serves as the headquarters of the First Army of Turkish Land Forces.

The Barracks is situated in the Harem neighbourhood between Üsküdar and Kadıköy, close to the Sea of Marmara. The highway connecting the ferry terminal and the overland bus terminal to the motorway  Istanbul-Ankara runs right past the barracks.

Construction
The original wooden barracks was designed by Krikor Balyan but was burnt down in 1806 by rebel Janissaries, who were resisting the sultan's reforms. Sultan Mahmud II commissioned the rebuilding of the barracks in stone in 1825 and the work was completed on 6 February 1828. During the reign of Sultan Abdülmecid I, the barracks were renovated twice, first in 1842–43 and again in 1849–50. During this process, a tower seven stories in height was added to each of the four corners, giving the barracks its current appearance. Three of the wings have three floors but the eastern wing only has two floors due to the sloping terrain.

Crimean War
See also Renkioi Hospital
During the Crimean War (1854–56), the barracks were allocated to the British Army, which was on its way from Britain to the Crimea. After the troops of its 33rd and 41st foot regiments left for the front, the barracks was converted into a temporary military hospital.

On 4 November 1854, Florence Nightingale arrived in Scutari with 37 volunteer nurses. They cared for thousands of wounded and infected soldiers until she returned home in 1857 as a heroine.

During the war around 6,000 soldiers died in the Selimiye Barracks, mostly as the result of a cholera epidemic. The dead were buried at a plot near the barracks, which later became the Haydarpaşa Cemetery.

Today, the northernmost tower of the barracks houses a small museum partly in memory of Nightingale.

References

Üsküdar
Military installations established in 1800
Krikor Amira Balyan buildings
Buildings and structures of the Ottoman Empire
Crimean War
Florence Nightingale
Buildings and structures in Istanbul
Barracks in Turkey
Military history of the Ottoman Empire
Military in Istanbul
Military history of Istanbul
19th-century architecture in Turkey